The Original Edit is the third official album by producer Dr. Zeus. All the vocals of this album were by Lehmber Hussainpuri. This album was released in May 2005 after much controversy. This album had no singles or music videos released because of the delay and big budget. This album was the reason for the breakup between two great bhangra performers: Lehmber Hussainpuri & Dr. Zeus

Meaning of the title
The Original Edit means that even though it is an edited version, it still is the original version out there. This was due to the controversy and early release of the album by Lehmber Hussainpuri in India under his own name.

Track listing
 Sachiyan Suniyan Ni - Lehmber Hussainpuri
 Je Jatt Bigr Gaya - Lehmber Hussainpuri
 Giddech Deor Meinu Lageyaa - Lehmber Hussainpuri
 Oh Kuri Patni - Lehmber Hussainpuri
 Nit Kush Naal Peendah - Lehmber Hussainpuri and Sabrina
 Das Ki Soniyeh - Lehmber Hussainpuri
 Putt Jattan Da Jawan - Lehmber Hussainpuri
 Yaaran Diya Yaarian Ne Mareyah - Lehmber Hussainpuri
 Je Jatt Bigr Gaya: The Mr. Shabz Mix - Lehmber Hussainpuri

Reviews
Dr. Zeus yet again won "The Album of The Year" award with this album and it was considered a top class album. The main reason for this was because the album was released 2 months earlier in India. Many people liked Folk Attack (Indian version of The Original Edit) rather than the original version because it didn't contain raps and MC's.
The Original Edit was a great album for modern bhangra fans and Folk Attack was a great album for older bhangra fans. So with 2 albums containing the same music all types of bhangra fans were satisfied.
This is ever greatest remixed album in which there is included grim on some tracks.
there was need of something new as it was just the remake of old songs.

Folk Attack

Due to Dr. Zeus not completing the tracks in time, Lehmber Hussainpuri took the uncompleted tracks behind Zeus' back to India. There he released an album called Folk Attack under BaseLine Records even though he was signed to Envy Records. All the songs from The Original Edit, plus 2 bonus songs (Adde and Kehre Pind Di) were on the album. Zeus, angry over how the tracks leaked, fired Lehmber and therefore this was the final project the two worked on together.

Dr. Zeus also decided to remove Lehmber's face from the booklet cover of the CD; leaving only his turban visible.

The album Back Unda Da Influence released a few years later which featured Lehmber Hussainpuri. Zeus decided to credit Lehmber as Lamb Burger Hussainpuri.

2005 albums
Bhangra (music) albums